Sababu is a 1999 Maldivian drama film directed by Ahmed Nimal. Produced by Aslam Rasheed under Slam Studio, the film stars Ibrahim Giyas, Aishath Shiranee and Ahmed Nimal in pivotal roles.

Premise
Azim (Ibrahim Giyas) is hired to work as a supervisor in a factory managed by Liusha (Aishath Shiranee). She meets a strange man, Niyaz (Ahmed Nimal) who is smitten by her beauty. One day, he saves  Liusha from being sexually abused by her classmate, Mohamed (Mohamed Afrah) though she blamed the whole incident on Niyaz. Later, they reconcile and start a romantic relationship. Complications arise when Azim confesseds his affection towards Liusha and Niyaz decides to sacrifice his love for the sake of his friend's happiness.

Cast 
 Ibrahim Giyas as Azim
 Aishath Shiranee as Liusha
 Ahmed Nimal as Niyaz
 Mariyam Rizla as Mary
 Hamid Wajeeh
 Ajwad Waheed as Aadan
 Mohamed Afrah as Mohamed
 Hassan Shafeeq

Soundtrack

References

Maldivian drama films
1999 films
Films directed by Ahmed Nimal
1999 drama films
Dhivehi-language films